Sylvania  is a Canadian multinational electronics corporation headquartered in Etobicoke, Ontario, Canada. The company is owned in North America by Osram Sylvania and, outside of North America, Feilo Sylvania.  The two license the brand to other companies for various products.  The Sylvania brand was originally owned by Sylvania Electric Products.

References

External links
 Official website

Consumer electronics brands
1990 establishments in Ontario
Electronics companies established in 1990
Companies based in Etobicoke
American brands
Indian brands